Edwin "Eddie" Montalvo (born 25 September 1952) is an American percussionist and bandleader of Puerto Rican descent. Born and raised in the Bronx, 
he best known for playing the Congas for Hector Lavoe, Rubén Blades as well as with the Fania All-Stars.

Early career
Montalvo began playing bongo at the age of seven. He began playing bongo in the parks and with local bands.  At the age of 17 he began playing professionally, first with Tony Pabon y La Protesta and Joey Pastrana. He switched to the congas when he joined Julio Romero & the Latin Jazz All-Stars.   In 1979 he auditioned for the Fania All-Stars where he became the youngest member of the group, replacing one of his mentors Ray Barretto.

Montalvo has recorded with Willie Colon, Johnny Pacheco, Los Kimbos, Celia Cruz, Ruben Blades, Cheo Feliciano, Bobby Valentin, Papo Lucca, Roberto Roena, Gilberto Santa-Rosa, Nicky Marrero, Gilbert Colon, Ismael Miranda, Johnny Pacheco as well as with Tito Rodriguez, Jr.

He played with Ruben Blades band for twelve years. Montalvo toured with Ruben Blades throughout Europe, Panama and other countries. Montalvo is on many albums such as Ruben Blades y Son Del Solar Live, Buscando America, Amor y Control, Esecenas and Siembra. In 1987 Escenas won a Grammy in the category of Best Tropical Latin Performance.

Montalvo's recording of the Siembra album with Willie Colón and Rubén Blades in 1979 remains one of the best selling salsa albums of all time. It has sold over 25 million copies, and almost all of its songs were hits at one time or another in various Latin American countries. Montalvo recorded songs such as Pedro Navaja,Cuentas Del Alma, Silencios, Buscando America, Desapariciones, Decisiones, and Todos Vuelven.

Later career
In 1995 he released his first solo album, On My Own.  Thereafter he joined Joe Madera's Big Three Palladium Orchestra. In 2012 Montalvo released his second solo album, Desde Nueva York a Puerto Rico. It was nominated for a 2013 Grammy Award in the category of Best Tropical Latin Album.
Montalvo played with the Tito Nieves band for three years. Thereafter he played with the Frankie Morales orchestra.
Due to his professional experience with Hector Lavoe Montalvo was asked to perform in and consult on El Cantante, featuring Marc Anthony and Jennifer Lopez. 
LP named a special series of Congas in his honor called LP® EDDIEMONTALVO SIGNATURE FIBERGLASS 

In addition to being a fulltime percussionist he also worked full time as a gas meter installer for over 25 years with ConEdison in New York.

Discography

As leader
Drum Solos Vol. 1 (1978, LP Ventures)
Drum Solos Vol. 2 (1978, LP Ventures)
Drum Solos Vol. 3 (1973, LP Ventures)
On My Own (1995, Castro Records)
Desde Nueva York A Puerto Rico (2012, Señor Marcha Records)
Señor Tambó (2020, Señor Marcha Records)

As sideman
With Ruben Blades
Rubén Blades* & Willie Colon* – En Argentina (1983)
Rubén Blades* Y Seis Del Solar - Buscando América (1984)
Rubén Blades* Y Seis Del Solar - Escenas (1985)
Siembra (1978)
Rubén Blades* Y Seis Del Solar - Escenas (1985)
Rubén Blades* Y Son Del Solar - Live! (1990)
Ruben Blades Con Son del Solar - Caminando (1991)
Rubén Blades* Con Son Del Solar - Amor y Control (1992)
With Tony Pabon
Tony Pabon Y La Nueva Protesta* - Fango - Pura Salsa, Puro Disco (1976)
With Los Kimbos
Los Kimbos Con Adalberto Santiago - Los Kimbos Con Adalberto Santiago (1976)
The Big Kimbos With Adalberto Santiago - The Big Kimbos With Adalberto Santiago (1977)
With Johnny Pacheco
Johnny Pacheco & Hector Casanova* - Los Amigos (1979)
Johnny Pacheco and Jose Fajardo* - Pacheco Y Fajardo (1982)
Johnny Pacheco & Pete "Conde" Rodriguez* - De Nuevo Los Compadres (1983)
Johnny Pacheco & Pete Rodriguez - Salsobita (1987)
Johnny Pacheco & Pete Conde Rodriguez* - Celebracion (1989)
Sima! (1993)
El Maestro: A Man and His Music (2006)
With Conjunto Classico
Conjunto Clasico Canta: Tito Nieves - Los Rodriguez (1979)
With Jose Mangual, Jr.
José Mangual Jr. Y Su Orquesta - Mangual (1980)
José Mangual Jr. Y Su Orquesta - Que Chevere (1982)
José Mangual Jr. Y Su Orquesta Con Carlos El Grande* - Lo Que Traigo Es Salsa (1983)
José Mangual Jr. - Latin Rhythm & Moods (1990)
Que Chevere (1998)
With Louie Cruz
Louie Cruz* - Coming Out
With Willie Colon
Willie Colón - Solo (1979)
With Johnny "Dandy" Rodriguez
Dandy's Dandy: A Latin Affair (1979)
With Hector Lavoe
Hector Lavoe - El Sabio (1980)
Hector Lavoe - Que Sentimiento! (1981)
Tu Bien Lo Sabes (2001)
With Fania All-Stars
Fania All Stars - Latin Connection (1981)
Fania All Stars - Social Change (1981)
Fania All Stars - Lo Que Pide La Gente (1984)
Fania All Stars - Habana Jam (1996)
Ponte Duro: The Fania All Stars Story (2010)
With Pete "El Conde" Rodriguez
El Rey (1990)
With Paul Simon
Paul Simon - Songs From The Capeman (1997)
The Vampires (2012)
The Complete Album Collection (2013)
With Celia Cruz
Celia, Johnny and Pete (1980)
La Experiencia (2004)
With Rigo Y Su Obra Maestra
Rigo Y Su Obra Maestra – Rumba Pa' Rumberos (2006)
With Marty Galagarza 
Marty Galagarza y La Conquistadora - Pinocho (1974)
With Seguida
Seguida - Love Is...(1974)
Seguida - On Our Way To Tomorrow...(1976)
Luis "Perico" Ortiz
Luis "Perico" Ortiz - My Own Image (1978)
With Pupi Legarreta
Pupi Legarreta – Pupi Pa’ Bailar (1980)
With Luigi Texidor
El Caballero (1980)
With Santiago Cerón
Canta Si Va’ Cantar (1981)
With Tito Allen
A Los Muchachos
With Luis Doñe Y El Conjunto Mangú Con Junior Soria
Mangú (1982)
With Santiago Cerón
Yo Soy La Ley (1983)
With Caco Senante 
Y Después... Que Le Pongan Salsa (1984)
With Ray Martínez Y Su Sabor Criollo
Sabor Criollo (1984)
With Monguito El Único 
Yo Soy La Meta (1985)
With Roberto Lugo
Este Es...Roberto Lugo

Filmography
Yo Soy La Salsa (2014)
El Cantante (2006)

See also
 Salsa
 Charanga (Cuba)
 Afro-Cuban jazz
List of Puerto Ricans

External links

 
 
 
 Grammy Awards nominees at Grammy.com (searchable database)

References

Afro-Cuban jazz percussionists
American people of Puerto Rican descent
American male drummers
American salsa musicians
Conga players
Fania Records artists
Latin jazz drummers
Latin music composers
Mambo musicians
Musicians from the Bronx
People from the Bronx
Salsa musicians
Salsa
20th-century American drummers
1952 births
Living people